Young and Dangerous 2 is a 1996 Hong Kong triad film directed by Andrew Lau. It is the first sequel in the Young and Dangerous film series.

Plot
In a flashback to Young and Dangerous, "Chicken" Chiu (Jordan Chan) heads into exile and decides to go to Taiwan, after a failed hit. The first part of the movie details the events leading up to his return to Hong Kong, following the death of his boss "Uncle Bee" (Frankie Ng). In Taiwan, Chicken's cousin introduces him to the "San Luen" Triad, headed by an influential Taiwanese senator. Although the atmosphere in the city is quite different than Hong Kong, Chicken gains the senator's favor by assassinating his rival. Pleased with the youth's initiative, he promotes Chicken to branch leader and does not even mind Chicken having been smitten with his beautiful mistress. Upon hearing news of Bee's death, Chicken returns to Hong Kong and helps best friends Chan Ho Nam (Ekin Cheng), Dai Tin-yee (Michael Tse) and K.K. (Halina Tam) to get rid of corrupt "Hung Hing" Chairman "Ugly Kwan" (Francis Ng).

The second part of the movie deals with returning Hung Hing Chairman Chiang Tin Sang (Simon Yam) trying to ally with San Luen and promote relationships, while trying to find a replacement branch leader of Causeway Bay, a position Bee held. Ho Nam is the most likely candidate, being Bee's must trusted underling, but a rivalry breaks out when another member "Tai Fei" (Anthony Wong) wants the position for himself. At the same time, Ho Nam's friend Pou Pan (Jerry Lam) recruits "Banana Skin" (Jason Chu), who bewilders Ho Nam and the rest of his friends because of his facial similarity to Pou Pan's deceased brother Chow Pan. During a visit back to Taiwan to see and thank the senator personally for helping them get rid of Kwan, Ho Nam and Chicken find him dead and are accused by San Luen of killing him.

In actuality, the culprit is the senator's mistress, who uses this opportunity to lead San Luen and break Hung Hing's grip on their gambling spots in Macau, reinforcing San Luen influence in the area. To that end, Tai Fei willingly allies with her and plots to have Ho Nam's candidacy for the Causeway Bay branch leadership tainted. Ho Nam is barely swayed by Tai Fei's threats, until a car accident cripples his girlfriend Smartie (Gigi Lai), putting her in a coma. Although disheartened at her condition, Ho Nam does not back out of the candidacy, and plans to stage an intervention at a San Luen opening of a new Macau casino, during which an important member of the Macau government will attend. Ho Nam's sabotage of the event is successful, destroying any credibility San Luen has in Macau and to Tai Fei's nomination.

In a tense Mexican standoff at town square, the senator's mistress and Tai Fei decides to settle things with Ho Nam and Chicken, summoning hundreds of San Luen and Hung Hing members. While it appears the victory is in the mistress' hands, it is Tai Fei who turns the gun on her: it was all a ploy on Hung Hing's part for him to ally with San Luen and provide a means to weed out any corrupt members in the Taiwanese society. Realizing it was she who killed the senator, San Luen's branch leaders decide to take her back to Taiwan for punishment, but Chicken requests he speak with her before she is led away. Upon stating she is the only woman he has ever truly loved, he executes her on the spot, knowing full well she will die more painfully in Taiwan. With the matter settled, Tai Fei abstains from the Causeway Bay branch leadership candidacy and Ho Nam is elected its leader.

Cast
 Ekin Cheng - Chan Ho Nam
 Jordan Chan - Chiu
 Gigi Lai - Smartie
 Jason Chu - Banana Skin
 Jerry Lamb - Pou Pan
 Michael Tse - Dai Tin-yee
 Halina Tam - K.K.
 Chingmy Yau - Ding-yiu
 Anthony Wong Chau-sang - Tai Fei
 Simon Yam - Chiang Tin Sang
 Blackie Ko
 Moses Chan

See also
 Young and Dangerous (series)

External links
 

1996 films
Triad films
1996 crime films
1990s Cantonese-language films
Golden Harvest films
Films directed by Andrew Lau
Young and Dangerous
1990s Hong Kong films